Pandalam Thekkekara  is a panchayath and also a cultural-spiritual village town in Pandalam in Pathanamthitta district in the state of Kerala, India.
Thattayil Orippurathu Bhagavathi Temple, Vrindavanam Venugopala Temple, Thattayil Ayyappa Temple, Thirumangalam Mahadeva Temple, Varikolil Vishnu Temple, Kandalanthara Shiva Temple, Anakuzhi Malanada Temple, Mynagappallil Anapoorneshwari Temple, Gurunadankkavu Temple are the main religious centres located here. 
Orippuram Meenabharani, Meenakarthika and Meena Thiruvathira festivals are the major festivals in Pandalam Thekkekkara Panchayath. Also, there are some important festivals happens in panchayath including Parappetty Pettathullal.

NSS Polytechnic College Pandalam and NSS Higher Secondary School, Thattayil are situated in the panchayath.St.John's School (CBSE) is also situated near to Keerukuzhy ward of Pandalam Thekkekkara.
Mannath Padmanabhan started
Nair Service Society Karayogam reform from here. The No.1 and No.2 NSS Karayogams are situated in Pandalam Thekkekkara.Mannath Padmanabhan also quoted about the Nairs of Thatta in his autobiography book "Ente Jeevitham Smaranakal".Mohanlal starred famous Malayalam feature film Appu (1990 film) shot in Pandalam Thekkekkara. There are currently 14 Wards in Pandalam Thekkekkara Panchayath. 

Major political parties are BJP, CPM, CPI & INC.

Agriculture is the main occupation in the Panchayath.

Pandalam Thekkekkara Panchayath is bordered by 2 Municipalities (Pandalam and  Adoor) and other 3 panchayaths (Kodumon, Vallicode and Thumpamon). Kulanada grama panchayath is also near to Pandalam Thekkekkara Panchayath. Pandalam Thekkekkara comes under Pathanamthitta Loksabha Constituency and Adoor Legislative Assembly Constituency.
National Highway NH 183A and NH 183 passes through Pandalam Thekkekkara Panchayath.

Reading Room & Library:  Many libraries are in Pandalam Thekkekara, however few are not functioning well.

The first library was in the old Panchayath building and its first librarian was T.K. Gopala Kurup.

Demographics
 India census, Pandalam Thekkekara had a population of 24069 with 11098 males and 12971 females. Hinduism is the major religion covers population with 86%, Christianity with 13%, others below 1%. In Caste wise Pandalam Thekkekkara is a Nairs dominant area.

References

Villages in Pathanamthitta district